Lalanga is a deep fried flatbread found in Greek and Turkish cuisines. Historically it was present in both Byzantine and Ottoman cuisines.

Etymology and history 

Lalanga was present both in the Byzantine and Ottoman cuisines; whilst in the former it was only eaten as a sweet, in Ottoman Turkey it was eaten both as a sweet dish with honey or as a savoury, with cheese. Lalanga continues to exist in the Turkish cuisine, as well as in the Greek Cuisine (mostly in Peloponnese) as Lalagia (In Greek Λαλάγγια).

Varieties in Ottoman Cuisine 
In the Ottoman printed cookbook, Ali Eşref Dede'nin Yemek Risalesi, there is a recipe as Lalanga.

See also
 List of doughnut varieties
 List of deep fried foods
 Frybread
 Shelpek
 Bhatoora
 Mekitsa
 BeaverTails

References

External links

Flatbreads
Ottoman cuisine
Doughnuts
Greek breads
Turkish breads
Pontic Greek cuisine